Phazaca erosioides is a moth of the family Uraniidae first described by Francis Walker in 1863. It is found in the Indo-Australian tropics from Sri Lanka to New Guinea.

In the male, the forewings are grey and the hindwings are pale yellow. The female has similar colours in the forewings, but the hindwings dark grey. The postmedial of forewing is similarly sinuous in both sexes.

References

Moths of Asia
Moths described in 1863
Uraniidae